Harry Hoppe (11 February 1894 – 23 August 1969) was a German general during World War II who commanded several divisions. He was also a recipient of the Knight's Cross of the Iron Cross with Oak Leaves of Nazi Germany.

Awards
 Iron Cross (1914) 2nd Class (20 March 1916) & 1st Class (15 March 1917)
 Clasp to the Iron Cross (1939) 2nd Class (26 September 1939) & 1st Class (12 July 1941)
 German Cross in Gold on 16 May 1942 as Oberst in Infanterie-Regiment 424
 Knight's Cross of the Iron Cross with Oak Leaves
 Knight's Cross on 12 September 1941 as Oberst and commander of Infanterie-Regiment 424
 Oak Leaves on 18 December 1944 as Generalleutnant and commander of the 278. Infanterie-Division

References

Citations

Bibliography

1894 births
1969 deaths
20th-century Freikorps personnel
German Army personnel of World War I
German prisoners of war in World War II held by the United Kingdom
Lieutenant generals of the German Army (Wehrmacht)
Military personnel from Braunschweig
Recipients of the clasp to the Iron Cross, 1st class
Recipients of the Gold German Cross
Recipients of the Knight's Cross of the Iron Cross with Oak Leaves
German Army generals of World War II